Onyeka Onwenu  (born 31 January 1952) is a Nigerian singer/songwriter, actress, human right activist, social activist, journalist, politician, and former X Factor series judge. Dubbed the "Elegant Stallion" by the Nigerian press, she is a former chairperson of the Imo State Council for Arts and Culture.
In 2013 she was appointed the Executive Director/Chief Executive Officer of the National Centre for Women Development.

Early life
Onwenu hails from Arondizuogu, a small town in Ideato North, Imo State, but was born and raised in Port Harcourt. She is the youngest daughter of Nigerian educationist and politician D. K. Onwenu, who died when she was four years old in an autocrash a week before his appointment as Minister for Education, leaving his widow, Hope, to raise five children alone after her husband's family denied her access to his property.

Education
Onwenu possesses a BA in International Relations and Communication from Wellesley College, Massachusetts, and an MA in Media Studies from The New School for Social Research, New York. She worked for the United Nations as a tour guide before returning to Nigeria in 1980 to complete her mandatory one-year national service with the NTA.

Career

Broadcasting
As an NTA employee, Onwenu made an impact as a newsreader and reporter. In 1984, she wrote and presented the internationally acclaimed BBC/NTA documentary Nigeria, A Squandering of Riches which became the definitive film about corruption in Nigeria as well as the intractable Niger Delta agitation for resource control and campaign against environmental degradation in the oil rich region of Nigeria. A former member of the board of the NTA, she has also worked as a TV presenter, hosting the shows Contact (1988) and Who's On? (1993) both on NTA Network. She won some awards like: African Movie Academy Award for Best Actress in a supporting role.

Music
Originally a secular artist, Onwenu made the transition to gospel music in the 90s, and most of her songs are self-penned. She continues to write and sing about issues such as health (HIV/AIDS), peace and mutual coexistence, respect for women rights, and the plight of children. She began her music career in 1981 while still working with the NTA, releasing the album For the Love of You, a pop album which featured an orchestral cover of Johnny Nash's "Hold Me Tight", and her second album Endless Life was produced by Sonny Okosun. Both records were released on the EMI label.

Onwenu's first album with Polygram, In The Morning Light, was released in 1984. Recorded in London, it featured the track "Masterplan" written by close friend Tyna Onwudiwe who had previously contributed to Onwenu's BBC documentary and subsequently sang back-up vocals on the album. After her fourth release, 1986's One Love which contained an updated version of the song "(In the) Morning Light, Onwenu collaborated with veteran jùjú artist Sunny Ade on the track "Madawolohun (Let Them Say)" which appeared in 1988's Dancing In The Sun. This was the first of three songs the pair worked on together; the other two - "Choices" and "Wait For Me" - centred on family planning, and were endorsed by the Planned Parenthood Federation of Nigeria who used "Choices" in their PSA. Onwenu's final release on Polygram was dedicated to Winnie Mandela, the subject of a song of the same name which Onwenu performed live when Nelson Mandela and his wife visited Nigeria in 1990 following his release from prison.

Onwenu diverted to Benson and Hedges Music in 1992 and released the self-titled Onyeka!, her only album with the label, after which she made the transition to Christian/gospel music. Her latest collection, "Inspiration for Change," focused on the need for an attitudinal change in Nigeria.

She is in partnership with Paris-based La Cave Musik, headed by a Nigerian cultural entrepreneur, Onyeka Nwelue and a UK-based Jungle Entertainment Ventures, headed by musicologist David Evans-Uhegbu. La Cave Musik is set to release her collection titled "Rebirth of a Legend". In recognition of her contribution to music and arts in Nigeria, she has been celebrated by professionals like Mahmood Ali-Balogun, Laolu Akins, Charles O'Tudor, and former PMAN president Tony Okoroji among others in the arts industry in Nigeria.

In 2013, Onwenu served as one of the three judges on X Factor Nigeria.

Politics
Onwenu is a member of the People's Democratic Party. She has contested twice to become the Local Council Chairman of her local government,  Ideato North Local Government Area of Imo State, and lost at both attempts. but was appointed Chairperson of Imo State Council for Arts and Culture by former governor Ikedi Ohakim. On 16 September 2013, President Goodluck Jonathan appointed her the Executive Director/Chief Executive Officer of the National Centre for Women Development.

Activism
In 2000, Onwenu protested against her former employer NTA over their refusal to pay royalties on her songs (NTA 2 Channel 5 had used "Iyogogo", a track from the Onyeka! album, in station idents without asking her permission), and after then-director general Ben Murray-Bruce blacklisted her from transmission, she embarked on a hunger strike outside the station's premises.  When questioned, Onwenu stated: "We find that the entertainment industry is suffering. Many artists have no pension, they're dying of hunger. These are people who are renowned, people who have made great contributions to the growth of the industry in Nigeria and we feel that this has got to come to an end."

Onwenu's activism attracted widespread support from various artists, including Charly Boy, who lambasted Nigeria's reluctance to pay royalties when songs are broadcast on television and radio. NTA resolved to settle the issue amicably, but denied barring Onwenu from appearing on their channels. The protest was called off after six days when Onwenu and NTA came to an arrangement regarding royalties.

Acting
Onwenu's first movie role was as Joke, a childless woman who adopts an abandoned baby in Zik Zulu Okafor's Nightmare. She has since featured in numerous Nollywood movies, and in 2006 she won the African Movie Academy Award for Best Actress in a Supporting Role for her performance in the movie "Widow's Cot". She was also nominated that same year for African Movie Academy Award for "Best Actress in a Leading Role" in the movie "Rising Moon" In 2014. She was in the movie Half of a Yellow Sun with Chiwetel Ejiofor and Thandiwe Newton, and Lion Heart (2018).

Personal life
Onwenu notably keeps her personal life private, and often refused to disclose private information regarding her ex-husband, a Yoruba Muslim. She is the mother of two children - Tijani Charles and Abraham.

Filmography

See also
 List of Nigerian gospel musicians

References

External links
 

Living people
1961 births
20th-century Nigerian actresses
20th-century Nigerian women singers
21st-century Nigerian actresses
21st-century Nigerian politicians
21st-century Nigerian women politicians
Actresses from Imo State
Best Supporting Actress Africa Movie Academy Award winners
Feminist musicians
HIV/AIDS activists
Igbo actresses
Igbo-language singers
Imo State politicians
Musicians from Anambra State
Nigerian actor-politicians
Nigerian women pop singers
Nigerian women singer-songwriters
Nigerian film actresses
Nigerian rhythm and blues singers
Nigerian television journalists
Nigerian television personalities
Nigerian women journalists
Wellesley College alumni
Women television journalists
Nigerian human rights activists
Nigerian politicians
The New School alumni